Asifa Bano Quraishi (aka Asifa Quraishi-Landes) (born July 17, 1967) is an American educator and legal scholar. She is a professor of law at the University of Wisconsin-Madison, where she teaches courses in Islamic law and U.S. constitutional law. She has served as a law clerk in United States federal courts. Her recent publications address issues of Islamic constitutionalism, in the context of separation of legal authority as well as methodologies of textual interpretation. Quraishi has also written articles for news outlets like The Washington Post and Middle East Eye addressing myths and issues associated with Islam.

Quraishi is a founding board member of the National Association of Muslim Lawyers (NAML), its sister organisation Muslim Advocates, based in San Francisco, and American Muslims Intent on Learning and Activism (AMILA). She is also an associate of the Muslim Women’s League, and has served as President and board member of Muslim Women’s League.

Quraishi received a Guggenheim Fellowship in 2012.

Education
She earned a Bachelor of Arts degree from the University of California-Berkeley in 1988 and a Juris Doctor degree from the University of California Davis School of Law in 1992. She also earned a Master of Laws degree from Columbia Law School in 1998 and a Doctor of Juridical Science degree from Harvard Law School in 2006.

Legal career
From 1993 to 1994, she served as a law clerk to District Judge Edward Dean Price of the United States District Court for the Eastern District of California and from 1994 to 1997, she served as a death penalty law clerk for the Ninth Circuit of the United States Court of Appeals.

Teaching career
She joined the faculty of University of Wisconsin Law School in 2004. From 2004 to 2012, she was an assistant professor of law. From 2012 to 2017, she was an associate professor of law. Since 2017, she has served as a full professor of law.

Selected publications

Books and journal articles 
"No Altars: An Introduction to Islamic Family Law" in Women’s Rights and Islamic Family Law: Perspective on Reform ed. Lynn Welchman and Abdullahi an-Naim. (Zed Books, 1996).
"Her Honor: An Islamic Critique of the Rape Laws of Pakistan from a Woman-Sensitive Perspective," 18 Mich. J. Int’l L. 287 (1997).

Online articles 

 Quraishi-Landes, Asifa (2016-06-24). "Five myths about sharia". The Washington Post.

 Quraishi-Landes, Asifa (9 May 2017). "How to create an Islamic government – not an Islamic state". Middle East Eye.

 Quraishi-Landes, Asifa (2017-06-08). "How anti-Shariah marches mistake Muslim concepts of state and religious law". Religion News Service. 
 Quraishi-Landes, Asifa (15 March 2019). "Perspective | Five myths about hijab". The Washington Post.

References 

1967 births
University of Wisconsin–Madison faculty
Living people
American academics of Pakistani descent
Harvard Law School alumni
Columbia Law School alumni
University of California, Berkeley alumni
UC Davis School of Law alumni
Women scholars of Islam
American Islamic studies scholars
Proponents of Islamic feminism